"Pas là" is a song by French singer Vianney released on July 25, 2014, under the label Tôt ou tard. It was included on the album Idées blanches. The music video was directed by Nicolas Bary, and released on 20 November 2014.

Charts

Weekly charts

Yearly charts

References 

2014 songs
Vianney (singer) songs
2014 singles